LCF may refer to:

Organisations
 Canadian Football League (Ligue canadienne de football)
 Lawyers' Christian Fellowship
 London College of Fashion

Science and technology
 Low-cycle fatigue, plastic deformation and low cycle
 LCF notation, for cubic Hamiltonian graphs
 Logic of Computable Functions, a deductive system for computable functions, 1969 formalism by Dana Scott
 Logic for Computable Functions, an interactive automated theorem prover, 1973 formalism by Robin Milner
 Landing Craft, Flak, a World war 2 Landing craft (BPC)

Transportation and military
 Low cab forward, a body style of truck
 Boeing 747 Large Cargo Freighter
 Launch control facility (disambiguation)
 De Zeven Provinciën-class frigate (Luchtverdedigings- en commandofregat, air defense and command frigate)

Other uses
 La Cañada Flintridge, California, a city in the US
 LCF, a signature in the movie The Ninth Gate